Amina is a 2021 film directed by Izu Ojukwu. It is based on the story of the life of 16th century Zazzau empire warrior Queen Amina. Amina premiered on Netflix on November 4, 2021. The film got the most nominations at Africa Magic Viewers’ Choice Awards, 2022.

Plot 
The film begins with a duel between Zazzau's champion Kabarkai and Danjuma. After witnessing the fight, a young Amina goes on to tell her father, the Emir of Zazzau (Abu Chris Gbakann) that she wants to be a warrior. This comes with resistance from Magaji Mjinyawa who advises that the Zazzau’s armies has never recruited a woman. The plot developed around events leading to Amina's ascension to the throne of Zazzau.

Cast 

 Lucy Ameh as Amina
 Ali Nuhu as Danjuma
 Clarion Chukwurah as Zumbura
 Abu Chris Gbakann as Sarki
 Magaji Mijinyawa as Madaki
 Habiba Ummi Mohammed as Zaria
 Asabe Madaki as Aladi Ameh

Reception 
The film was criticised for being in Hausa and for its lead actor being non-Hausa. It has also been criticized for containing several historical inaccuracies. Ojukwu responded that the lack of sufficient archives and data for Nigeria's historical events made it difficult to produce the movie.

Awards and nominations

References 

2021 films